The Mexico national under-15 football team represents Mexico in tournaments and friendly matches at the Under-15 level.  They have appeared in one CONCACAF Under-15 Championship in 2017, where they finished as champions.

History
Since 2012, Mexico has hosted the U15 Mexico Copa de Naciones, and won the inaugural title against Colombia U15s by penalties on 12 June 2012.

Coached by Juan Carlos Ortega, the Mexico U15s won the 2017 in a 2-0 final against the USA U15s. They finished the tournament with a perfect record winning all 5 matches, scoring 15 goals and conceding none.

Competitive record

Honours
CONCACAF Under-15 Championship
 Winners (1): 2017

See also
 Mexico national football team
 Mexico national under-23 football team
 Mexico national under-21 football team
 Mexico national under-20 football team
 Mexico national under-18 football team
 Mexico national under-17 football team
 Mexico women's national football team
 Mexico national beach football team
 Mexico national futsal team

References

External links 
 Mexico U15 Official Site

Mexico
Football